The 2003 UEFA European Under-19 Championship was held in Liechtenstein from 16 to 26 July 2003. Players born after 1 January 1984 could participate in this competition.

Venues

Qualifications
There were two separate rounds of qualifications held before the Final Tournament.

1. 2003 UEFA European Under-19 Championship first qualifying round
2. 2003 UEFA European Under-19 Championship second qualifying round

Teams 
The eight teams that participated in the final tournament were:

 
 
 
 
 
  (host)

Match officials 
Six referees were selected for the tournament:

 Michael Weiner
 Athanassios Briakos
 Ruud Bossen
 Nikolai Ivanov
 Carlos Megía Dávila
 Selçuk Dereli

Squads

Group stage

Group A

Group B

Semi-finals

Final

Goalscorers 
5 goals
 Paulo Sérgio

3 goals
 Sébastien Grax

2 goals

 Roman Kienast
 Lukas Mössner
 Klaus Salmutter
 René Schicker
 Petr Mikolanda
 Simon Laner
 Francesco Lodi
 Giampaolo Pazzini
 Della Rocca
 Hugo Almeida
 Pedro Pereira

1 goal

 Salmin Čehajić
 Jürgen Säumel
 Josef Brodský
 Milan Matula
 Lukáš Nachtman
 Václav Procházka
 Pavel Siranec
 Stewart Downing
 Liam Ridgewell
 Wayne Routledge
 Sylvain Idangar
 Alberto Aquilani
 Raffaele Palladino
 Martin Büchel
 Sandro Maierhofer
 Daniel Fredheim Holm
 Olav Tuelo Johannesen
 Branimir Poljac
 Daniel
 Fonseca
 Organista
 João Pereira

Own goals
 Claudio Alabor (playing against Portugal)
 Christoph Bühler (playing against Norway)

See also
 2003 UEFA European Under-19 Championship first qualifying round
 2003 UEFA European Under-19 Championship second qualifying round

External links 
  at UEFA.com
 Match list at rsssf.com

 
2003
2002–03 in European football
2003
2002–03 in Liechtenstein football
2002–03 in Italian football
2002–03 in Portuguese football
2003 in Norwegian football
2002–03 in Austrian football
2002–03 in Czech football
2002–03 in English football
2002–03 in French football
July 2003 sports events in Europe
2003 in youth association football